Donacaula pulverealis is a moth in the family Crambidae. It was described by George Hampson in 1919. It is found in Brazil and Bolivia.

References

Moths described in 1919
Schoenobiinae